Eastern European cuisine encompasses many different cultures, ethnicities, languages, and histories of Eastern Europe.

The cuisine of the region is strongly influenced by its climate and still varies, depending on a country. For example, countries of the Sarmatic Plain (Belarusian, Russian and Ukrainian cuisine) show many similarities.

Characteristics
According to the Ethnic Food Lover's Companion, all significant Eastern European cuisines are closely connected with the political, social and economic revival of the region following the long periods of historical turmoil. "These are substantial cuisines, meaty, rooty, smoky – part comfort food, part extravagance." Their main ingredients include eggs, used most frequently in doughs and pastries; dairy products (with yogurt and cheese among the staples); grains, including rye, barley, wheat, buckwheat and millet used in kashas and in the making of breads; vegetables, in cold storage and in pickling; fish (salmon, pike, carp and herring), birds and poultry (chicken, duck, goose, partridge, quail, turkey); red meats such as veal, beef, pork and mutton; and plentiful fruits including pears, plums, cherries, raspberries, pomegranates, dates, and figs, used for desserts and a variety of liqueurs. The nutritional index of traditional dishes is generally high cholesterol, high sodium, and high fat.

See also

 Armenian cuisine
 Ashkenazi Jewish cuisine
 Azerbaijani cuisine
 Balkan cuisine
 Belarusian cuisine
 Bulgarian cuisine
 Czech cuisine
 Georgian cuisine
 Hungarian cuisine
 Kazakh cuisine
 Moldovan cuisine
 Gagauz cuisine
 Polish cuisine
 Romanian cuisine
 Russian cuisine
 Bashkir cuisine
 Komi cuisine
 Mordovian cuisine
North Caucasian cuisine
 Chechen cuisine
 Circassian cuisine
 Ossetian cuisine
  Tatar cuisine
  Udmurt cuisine
 Yamal cuisine
 Slovak cuisine
 Soviet cuisine
 Ukrainian cuisine
 Crimean Tatar cuisine
 Odesite cuisine

References

Books on Eastern European cuisine
 Елена Молоховец, Подарок молодым хозяйкам, 1861-1917; in Russian. English edition: Elena Molokhovets, Classic Russian Cooking:  A Gift to Young Housewives. Indiana University Press, 1998. 
 Institute of Nutrition of the Academy of Medical Scientists of the USSR, Книга о вкусной и здоровой пище. Москва: Пищевая промышленность, 1939-1999; in Russian. English edition: The Book of Tasty and Healthy Food: Iconic Cookbook of the Soviet Union. SkyPeak Publishing LLC, 2012, 
 Кулинария. Госторгиздат, 1955-1958 (Cookery, Moscow: Soviet state publishing house for business literature, 1955-1558; Russian)
 В. В. Похлебкин, Национальные кухни наших народов. Москва: Пищевая промышленность, 1980, ; in Russian. English edition: V. V. Pokhlebkin. Russian Delight: A Cookbook of the Soviet People, London: Pan Books, 1978
 В. В. Похлёбкин, Кулинарный словарь от А до Я.  Москва: Центрполиграф, 2000,  (William Pokhlyobkin, Culinary Dictionary. Moscow: Centrpoligraf, 2000; Russian)
 J. Gronow, S. Zhuravlev, The Establishment of Soviet Haute Cuisine. In Educated Tastes: Food, Drink, and Connoisseur Culture. Ed: Jeremy Strong. University of Nebraska Press, 2011, 
 Darra Goldstein, A Taste of Russia: A Cookbook of Russia Hospitality, Russian Life Books, 2nd edition: 1999, 
 Darra Goldstein, The Georgian Feast: The Vibrant Culture and Savory Food of Georgia. University of California Press, 2013, 
 Anya Von Bremzen, John Welchman. Please to the Table: The Russian Cookbook. Workman Pub., 1990. 
 Metzger, Christine (ed.), Culinaria Germany. Cambridge: Ullmann, 2008.
 
 Robert Strybel, Maria Strybel, Polish Heritage Cookery. Hippocrene Books, 2005. 
 Massimo Montanari, Il mondo in cucina (The world in the kitchen). Laterza, 2002
 Sidney Mintz. Tasting Food, Tasting Freedom: Excursions into Eating, Power, and the Past. Beacon Press, 1997, 
 Mintalová - Zubercová, Zora: Všetko okolo stola I.(All around the table I.), Vydavateľstvo Matice slovenskej, 2009, 
 Л. Я. Старовойт, М. С. Косовенко, Ж. М. Смирнова, Кулінарія. Київ: Вища школа, 1992,  (L. Ya. Starovoit, M. S. Kosovenko, Zh. M. Smirnova, Cookery, Kyiv: Vyscha Shkola, 1992; Ukrainian)
 Українські страви. Київ: Державне видавництво технiчної  лiтератури УРСР, 1960 (Ukrainian Dishes. Kyiv: State publishing house of the Ukrainian SSR, 1960; Ukrainian)
 Л. М. Безусенко (ред.): Українська нацiональна кухня. Київ: Сталкер, 2002,   (L. M. Besussenko (Ed.): Ukrainian National Cuisine. Kyiv: Stalker, 2002; Ukrainian)

European cuisine
Eastern European culture